The University of Texas Press (or UT Press) is a university press that is part of the University of Texas at Austin.  Established in 1950, the Press publishes scholarly books and journals in several areas, including Latin American studies, Texana, anthropology, U.S. Latino studies, Native American studies, African American studies, film & media studies, classics and the ancient Near East, Middle East studies, natural history, art, and architecture.  The Press also publishes trade books and journals relating to their major subject areas.

Journals

 Asian Music
 Diálogo
 Information & Culture
 Journal of Cinema and Media Studies (formerly known as Cinema Journal)
 Journal of the History of Sexuality
 Journal of Individual Psychology
 Journal of Latin American Geography
 Latin American Music Review
 Studies in Latin American Popular Culture
 Texas Studies in Literature and Language
 The Textile Museum Journal
 US Latina & Latino Oral History Journal
 The Velvet Light Trap

Formerly published journals
 Archaeoastronomy
 Art Lies
 Genders
 The Joyce Studies Annual
 The Latin American Research Review
 Social Science Quarterly
 Southwestern Historical Quarterly

See also

 List of English-language book publishing companies
 List of university presses
 Texas A&M University Press
 Texas Tech University Press

References

External links
University of Texas Press

Press
Texas, University of
Publishing companies established in 1950
Book publishing companies based in Texas